Innocent Vareed Thekkethala (born 28 February 1948) is an Indian actor and politician. He predominantly works in Malayalam cinema in addition to Hindi, English, Tamil, and Kannada films, mostly in comedic roles. He has acted in more than 750 films and is considered one of the best comedians in Malayalam cinema. He has also appeared in villainous roles, such as in Mazhavilkavadi, Ponmuttayidunna Tharavu and Ganamela. Innocent has won several awards, including three Kerala State Film Awards. He served as the Member of Parliament in the 16th Lok Sabha of India representing Chalakudy constituency.

In 1979, he was elected as the municipal councilor of irinjalakkuda municipality. Innocent won the 2014 Lok Sabha elections from Chalakudy Lok Sabha constituency as an independent candidate supported by the Left Democratic Front (LDF). Innocent served as the president of the Association of Malayalam Movie Artists (AMMA), a guild of Malayalam artists from 2003 to 2018. He has written books based on his memories, and columns in magazines and newspapers.

Early life
Innocent was born on 28 February 1948 to Vareed Thekkethala and Margaret in Irinjalakuda, Travancore-Cochin (present-day Kerala), India. He is the fifth child and third son of his parents, who had eight children. He had his primary education at Little Flower Convent Higher Secondary School, Irinjalakuda, Don Bosco Higher Secondary School, Irinjalakuda, and Sree Sangameswara NSS School, Irinjalakuda. He studied till eighth grade and discontinued his studies as he could not cope with studying. Innocent went to Madras (then) for his acting career and worked there as a production executive and during that time he acted in a minor role in the movie Nellu, which was one of his earlier movies. He fell ill and came to Davangere in the 1970s for treatment for Typhoid, where his cousins George (studying medicine at JJM Medical College), Davis, and his brother Sunny were running the Shamannur Match factory, in Davangere. Later, he was an active partner in the working of the factory. As Innocent was keen on the performance activities, he seized the opportunity to participate in Davangere, Kerala Samajam drama, and received audience approval in entertainment events.

He left Davangere in 1974, set up a leather business, then a cycle renting business to make a living. Growing up, he had a few conflicts with his father, Vareed, because his brothers continued to have an excellent education and became successful doctors, lawyers, and judges. After some time, he joined politics and became Municipal councilor of Irinjalakuda.

Film career
Innocent's mannerisms and diction is unique in Malayalam cinema and he wildly caught the attention of the Malayalam audience. This made him almost a phenomenon in the Malayalam comedy scene, also making him a hot favorite for mimicry artistes. His popularity can be gauged from the fact that many frontline directors in Malayalam (like Priyadarshan, Satyan Anthikkad, Fazil and Kamal) rarely make films without Innocent. He has proven his acting skills in serious and character roles in several films. He has been the president of the Association of Malayalam Movie Artistes (AMMA) for 12 years. He has held the post for the last four consecutive terms.

Innocent entered the film industry in 1972 with the movie Nrityashala. At first, he produced a few serious offbeat films, but he was not successful. In the long span of his career, Innocent has worked in more than 500 films in a variety of roles, mainly in Malayalam. He has also acted in a few Tamil and Hindi films.

Innocent played comedy roles in like Ramji Rao Speaking, Mannar Mathai Speaking, Kilukkam, Godfather, Vietnam Colony, Nadodikattu and Devaasuram. Innocent has also excelled in character and villain roles such as Keli, Kathodu Kathoram.

Other films included Kabooliwaala, Gajakesariyogam, Mithunam, Mazhavilkavadi, Manassinakkare, Thuruppugulan, Rasathanthram, and Mahasamudram. His effort, along with that of the superstars who starred in these films, played an important role in their success. His pairing with K. P. A. C. Lalitha was highly successful in movies such as Ponn Muttayidunna Tharavu, My Dear Muthachchan, Godfather and Manichitrathazhu.

2020 is the only year he didn't appear in any films due to Cancer treatment since 1980.

Books
Innocent has authored five books: Njan Innocent, Cancer Wardile Chiri, Irinjalakudakku Chuttum (memoirs), Mazha Kannadi (collection of short stories) and Chirrikku Pinnil (autobiography). Cancer Wardile Chiri (Laughter in the Cancer Ward) is an account of his experiences while undergoing treatment for throat cancer. Irinjalakudakku Chuttum won the Kerala Sahitya Akademi Award for Humour in 2020.

Politics
Innocent was the Thrissur District Secretary of the Revolutionary Socialist Party during the 1970s. He had contested in the Irinjalakkuda municipal council elections as Revolutionary Socialist Party-backed candidate in 1979 and had won that election. He was rumoured to be a Left Democratic Front (LDF)-supported independent candidate from the Irinjalakkuda assembly constituency in the 2006 Kerala Legislative Assembly elections but this did not happen. Innocent won the 2014 Lok Sabha elections from Chalakudy Lok Sabha constituency in Thrissur district as an independent candidate supported by the LDF.

He lost in the Lok Sabha elections 2019 to UDF candidate Benny Behanan.

Personal life
He married Alice on September 26, 1976, and have a son, Sonnet. Sonnet is married, with two children, Innocent Jr and Anna. Innocent Jr has acted in a documentary as Innocent in childhood.

Awards

Kerala State Film Awards
 1989 – Second Best Actor – Mazhavil Kavadi
 1981 – Second Best Film (Producer) – Vida Parayum Munpe
 1982 – Second Best Film (Producer) – Ormakkayi

Kerala State Film Critics Award
 2009 – Best Actor – Patham Nilayile Theevandi

Asianet Film Award
 2001 – Supporting Actor Award – Ravanaprabhu
 2004 – Supporting Actor Award – Vesham
 2006 – Best Actor in a Comic Role – Rasathanthram, Yes Your Honour
 2008 – Supporting Actor Award – Innathe Chintha Vishayam
 2010 - Character Actor Award -Kadha Thudarunnu
 2011 - Character Actor Award -Snehaveedu, Swapna Sanchari
 2013 – Lifetime Achievement Award

Other awards
 2004 - Filmfare Award for Best Supporting Actor – Malayalam for Manassinakkare
 2007 – Sathyan Award
 2008 – Annual Malayalam Movie Award (Dubai) for Outstanding Performance
 2013 – TTK Prestige-Vanitha Film Awards – Lifetime Achievement Award
 2019 –He is Distributing Awards Realtors Investors Summit

Filmography

As actor

Malayalam films

1970s

1980s

1990s

2000s

2010s

2020s

Other language films

Story
 Pavam IA Ivachan (1994)
 Keerthanam (1995)

Producer
 Vida Parayum Munpe (1981)
 Ilakkangal (1982)
 Ormakkayi (1982)
 Lekhayude Maranam Oru Flashback (1983)

Playback singing
 Aanachandam – Gajakesariyogam (1990)
 Kandallo – Sandram (1990)
 Kunukupenmaniye – Mr Butler (2000)
 Onnam Malakeri – Kalyanaraman (2002)
 Sundarakeralam – Doctor Innocentanu (2012)

Television

References

Further reading

External links
 
 
 Movie Index
 Profile of Malayalam Actor Innocent
 16th LS member from Kerala

Indian male comedians
People from Irinjalakuda
Indian male film actors
Male actors from Kerala
Kerala State Film Award winners
Living people
1948 births
People from Thrissur
Filmfare Awards South winners
India MPs 2014–2019
Independent politicians in India
Indian actor-politicians
Kerala municipal councillors
Malayalam comedians
20th-century Indian male actors
Kerala politicians
Revolutionary Socialist Party (India) politicians
People from Chalakudy
Politicians from Thrissur
Male actors in Kannada cinema
Male actors in Hindi cinema
Male actors in Tamil cinema
Male actors in Malayalam cinema
21st-century Indian male actors
Malayalam screenwriters
Malayalam playback singers
Malayalam film producers
Film producers from Kerala
Male actors from Thrissur
Male actors in Malayalam television
Recipients of the Kerala Sahitya Akademi Award